The British 3rd Aircraft Carrier Squadron also called Third Aircraft Carrier Squadron was a military formation of Aircraft Carriers of the Royal Navy from January 1948 to July 1952.

History
The 3rd Aircraft Carrier Squadron was established in February 1947 and allocated to the Home Fleet. In December 1952 the squadron was re-designated Heavy Squadron  that consisted of a mix of battleships, aircraft carriers and cruisers of the Home fleet. In December 1953 the Flag Officer, Heavy Squadron became Flag Officer, Aircraft Carriers with a responsibility for all the operational carriers. His title and responsibility were later changed to Flag Officer, Carriers and Amphibious Ships in 1968.

Administration

Rear-Admiral/Vice-Admiral, Commanding 3rd Aircraft Carrier Squadron
Included:

References

Sources
 Heathcote, T. A. (2002). British Admirals of the Fleet: 1734–1995. Barnsley, England: Pen and Sword. .
 Mackie, Colin. "Royal Navy Senior Appointments from 1865" (PDF). gulabin.com. Gordon Mackie, July 2018. 
 Watson, Dr Graham. "Royal Navy Organisation and Ship Deployment 1947-2013". www.naval-history.net. Gordon Smith, 12 July 2015.

Aircraft Carrier squadrons of the Royal Navy
Military units and formations established in 1947
Military units and formations disestablished in 1951